Why Wait is second studio album by American country music artist Kristy Lee Cook. It was released on September 16, 2008 via Arista Nashville. The album's only single, "15 Minutes of Shame" has peaked at number 28 on the Hot Country Songs charts. The album debuted at number eight on the US Top Country albums chart, and at number 49 on the Billboard 200 with a first week sales of just under 10,000, and has sold 32,000 copies since its release. Cook was dropped by Arista Nashville in December the same year.

Two of the album tracks are cover versions. "God Bless the USA", was originally recorded by Lee Greenwood and "Cowgirls", a bonus track only available on iTunes, was originally recorded by Kerry Harvick for an unreleased album. "Like My Mother Does" was later recorded and released as singles by country singers Jesse Lee in 2010 and Lauren Alaina in 2011.

Track listing

A iTunes bonus track

Personnel
 Kelly Archer - background vocals
 Mike Brignardello - bass guitar
 Randy Cantor - acoustic guitar, electric guitar, mandolin, mellotron, piano, strings, string arrangements
 Kristy Lee Cook - lead vocals
 J.T. Corenflos - electric guitar
 Eric Darken - percussion
 Larry Franklin - fiddle, mandolin
 Brett James - background vocals
 Mike Johnson - steel guitar
 Charlie Judge - keyboards
 Troy Lancaster - electric guitar
 Mike Rojas - keyboards
 Ilya Toshinsky - acoustic guitar
 Lonnie Wilson - drums

Charts

Album

References

Allmusic (see infobox)

2008 debut albums
Kristy Lee Cook albums
Arista Records albums
Albums produced by Brett James